Syn og Segn is a Norwegian quarterly cultural and political periodical published in Oslo, Norway.

History and profile
Syn og Segn was founded in 1894, and Rasmus Flo and Arne Garborg were the first editors. The magazine is published in Nynorsk quarterly by Det Norske Samlaget, and has been important for the development of the Nynorsk as a cultural language. Olav Midttun was the editor-in-chief for over fifty years, from 1908 to 1960. Fagernes-based Knut Aastad Bråten has edited the magazine since 2014; succeeding Bente Riise who had served in the post since 2006.

The number of subscribers was largest in the 1960s when it reached about 13,000. In 2004 the number of subscribers was about 2,500. The circulation in 2004 was about 3,100.

In 2010 the magazine was named "Periodical of the Year" in Norway by the Norwegian Association of Journals.

See also
 List of magazines in Norway

References

External links
 Official website

1894 establishments in Norway
Cultural magazines
Magazines established in 1894
Magazines published in Oslo
Nynorsk
Norwegian-language magazines
Political magazines published in Norway
Quarterly magazines published in Norway